Zereshgi (also Romanized as Zereshgī; also known as Zereshkī) is a village in Samen Rural District, Samen District, Malayer County, Hamadan Province, Iran. At the 2006 census, its population was 88, in 32 families.

References 

Populated places in Malayer County